TSS Princess Ena was a passenger vessel built for the London and South Western Railway in 1906.

History

She was built by Gourlay Brothers in Dundee and launched on 25 May 1906. She was built as a replacement for the Hilda, lost in the English Channel in 1905. She was built in four months, with the order being placed in December 1905.

She was requisitioned by the Admiralty in 1915 and converted to a Q-ship. She returned to railway service at the conclusion of hostilities.

She was acquired by the Southern Railway in 1923.

References

1906 ships
Steamships of the United Kingdom
Ships of the London and South Western Railway
Ships of the Southern Railway (UK)
Ships built in Dundee
Maritime incidents in 1935
Ship fires
Shipwrecks in the English Channel